João André Pinto Neto (born 28 December 1981) is a Portuguese judoka. He was born in Coimbra. He is the European Champion 2008.

Achievements

References

External links
 
 

1981 births
Living people
Portuguese male judoka
Olympic judoka of Portugal
Judoka at the 2004 Summer Olympics
Judoka at the 2008 Summer Olympics
Sportspeople from Coimbra
20th-century Portuguese people
21st-century Portuguese people